Aegviidu is a borough in Anija Parish, Harju County, Estonia, most known for its picturesque surroundings and hiking trails.

As of November 22, 2022, the borough had a population of 695.

Etymology
Aegviidu was first mentioned in the will of Baron Johan von Bremen of Lehtse in 1522 as Agevidt farm. Before 1796, the area had also been referred to as Aykeuyte, Aykwit, Aigkewit, Aigwido, and Aegwiid.

On the 1805 topographic map of the Governorate of Estonia, the settlement was referred to as Charlottenhof, on the 1840 topographic map of the Gulf of Finland as both Aigvitu and Charlotenhof, and on the 1844 topographic map of the Governorate of Estonia as Charlottenberg. The prefix of Charlotte- is likely a reference to Charlotte Dorothea von Friesell, wife of Lord Alexander Georg von  of Lehtse. The new name stuck around until Estonia first became independent and place names were estonianized.

Some sources claim that the name Aegviidu first appeared in the 18th century, when the Piibe road was being built through the local bogs, or in the 19th century, when the Tallinn-Narva railway was being built, which took lots of time (Aeg + viidu). These theories are disproven by the fact that the first written record of the name being used is from the 16th century.

Another theory claims that the name Aegviidu comes from the name of Saint Aegidius, which seems unlikely, as there are no surviving records of him being worshipped in Estonia.

History

Early History 
It is speculated that during the antiquity a winter road passed through the area of Aegviidu that connected Kehra and Jäneda. The ancient  is located just a few kilometers southeast of current Aegviidu, on the coast of Kalijärv. The hillfort was likely in use between the 11th and 13th centuries.

In 1467, the Kosenõmme mill had been referred to as Kossgen-Nomme. By 1510, the mill had seemingly disappeared, when Kossenem only referred to a regular farm. In 1511, the farm had been referred to as Kaszenum. 

Aegviidu was first mentioned in the will of Baron Johan von Bremen of Lehtse in 1522 as Agevidt farm. The section of Piibe road, that passes through current Aegviidu was likely first built sometime during the 17th century. At the beginning of the 18th century there are reports of an inn operating in the vicinity of Aegviidu. In 1714, there are records of Aigwido Mart from Koseneme, while in 1755 there are records of Aegwidi Jaan from Aegwiid, suggesting that what would eventually become Aegviidu was initially part of Kosenõmme.

Manor 

On the 1805 topographic map of the Governorate of Estonia, the settlement was referred to as Charlottenhof, likely a reference to Charlotte Dorothea von Friesell, wife of the then Lord of Lehtse. In 1820, there are records of a coaching inn and a hunting lodge in the settlement. At approximately the same time, Chartlottenhof cattle manor is also mentioned, being located near the current Piibe road railway crossing point and belonging to the Lehtse manor. By the beginning of the 20th century, a post office, a pharmacy, and a general store had been built in the settlement. In 1917, the Lord of Lehtse gifted the Aegviidu hunting lodge to a local educational society and a school started operating there. Since the hunting lodge was not fit to be a schoolhouse, the educational society acquired the coaching inn from the Lord in 1919, and the school has operated there ever since. The hunting lodge is currently used as a community center.On December 6, 1896, the Alexandra chapel of Aegviidu was solemnly consecrated, being later renamed to Alexander chapel of Aegviidu. The current tower of the chapel was built in 1940. The chapel was badly damaged in the March bombings of 1944. The insides of the chapel were thoroughly renovated in the 1970s.

Lehtse manor, along its subsidiaries, was nationalized in 1919.

Railway 

In 1870, the St. Petersburg-Tallinn-Paldiski railway commenced operations, with Aegviidu serving as a class III station. The station's two-story historistic wooden building features an asymmetric facade and a low, multisectional gable roof, similar to buildings in Keila and Paldiski. The railway, along with the construction of a water tower and a locomotive depot, greatly accelerated the growth of Aegviidu, which was previously sparsely populated.

Just before the Estonian War of Independence, Konstantin Päts assigned Eduard Piibemann to organize the Aegviidu self-defense force. On the night of February 24, 1918, the force detained a Russian detachment near the railroad in Aegviidu and confiscated their weapons. Although the Soviets briefly captured Aegviidu on January 1, 1919, the Estonians recaptured it by railway on January 5, 1919, a day after the decisive Battle of Kehra.

The Tallinn-Aegviidu railway line saw further development, with the first electrified train between Kehra and Aegviidu running on August 3, 1978, and the second pair of rails from Aegviidu to Kehra and Lehtse laid in 1987 and 1991, respectively. The electrified part of the Tallinn-Tapa railway terminates roughly halfway between Aegviidu and Nelijärve railway stations. The new Stadler FLIRT trains began servicing the Tallinn-Aegviidu line on July 1, 2013.

The  was opened in the early 1940s to provide convenient access to the  recreation center, which was built in 1938 on the shore of Purgatsi lake. The development of Aegviidu slowed down after the second world war.

Politics 
Aegviidu gained the rights of a summering borough in 1926 and the rights of a borough in 1945. The borough became self-governing on June 20, 1991, and became a borough-parish on August 25, 1993. Aegviidu became a part of Anija parish on October 21, 2017.

Geography

Nature 

Aegviidu area is hilly. In the Nelijärve area there are 7 lakes.

Climate 
Aegviidu is in the transition zone between maritime and continental climates. On average, the annual temperature is 5.0 °C, the annual rainfall is 700mm, and wind mostly blows from west and south-west. There are about 1750 hours of sunshine per year.

According to MSN weather, the highest known temperature was recorded in August, 2010, being 34 °C, and the lowest known temperature was recorded in December, 1996, being -35 °C.

Demographics 
Historically, the area had been sparsely populated up until the 19th century, when a cattle manor and the railway were built there. When the settlement was given the rights of a summering borough in 1926, it started growing even more rapidly. The population growth lasted approximately until the 1970s, when it started declining at the same rate as it had grown. Kosenõmme became a part of Aegviidu in the 1970s. As of 2021, estonians make up approximately 90% of the population.

Gallery

Notable people
Jan Kaus (born 1971), writer, was born in Aegviidu.
Anna Raudkats (1886–1965), dance pedagogue, is buried into Aegviidu cemetery

References

Further reading 

 Saar, Asmu (1972). Aegviidu-Nelijärve (in Estonian). Eesti Raamat. . online
 Kink, Hella (2013). Harjumaa : Põhja-Kõrvemaa : Kuusalu, Anija, Aegviidu (in Estonian). Eesti Teaduste Akadeemia Kirjastus. . online

External links 

Articles containing video clips
Boroughs and small boroughs in Estonia
Populated places in Harju County
Former municipalities of Estonia
Resorts in Estonia
Tourist attractions in Harju County